Rod Jameson (born 30 June 1970) is a former professional Australian rules footballer who played for the Adelaide Football Club in the Australian Football League (AFL). He was the Adelaide's leading goal kicker in 1991 before spending most of his later career in the midfield and backline. He was well known for his shaved head and superb long kicking and played in Adelaide's 1997 premiership win though he was injured during the first quarter of the game. He retired from the AFL at just 29 years of age.

He is now a pundit on ABC Radio on AFL matches held in Adelaide.

Statistics

|-
|- style="background-color: #EAEAEA"
! scope="row" style="text-align:center" | 1991
|style="text-align:center;"|
| 35 || 19 || 49 || 28 || 166 || 78 || 244 || 79 || 18 || 2.6 || 1.5 || 8.7 || 4.1 || 12.8 || 4.2 || 0.9 || 0
|-
! scope="row" style="text-align:center" | 1992
|style="text-align:center;"|
| 35 || 14 || 23 || 14 || 131 || 100 || 231 || 48 || 14 || 1.6 || 1.0 || 9.4 || 7.1 || 16.5 || 3.4 || 1.0 || 0
|- style="background-color: #EAEAEA"
! scope="row" style="text-align:center" | 1993
|style="text-align:center;"|
| 35 || 19 || 6 || 2 || 156 || 99 || 255 || 60 || 30 || 0.3 || 0.1 || 8.2 || 5.2 || 13.4 || 3.2 || 1.6 || 0
|-
! scope="row" style="text-align:center" | 1994
|style="text-align:center;"|
| 35 || 20 || 0 || 0 || 235 || 120 || 355 || 61 || 27 || 0.0 || 0.0 || 11.8 || 6.0 || 17.8 || 3.1 || 1.4 || 0
|- style="background-color: #EAEAEA"
! scope="row" style="text-align:center" | 1995
|style="text-align:center;"|
| 35 || 21 || 4 || 0 || 207 || 71 || 278 || 50 || 16 || 0.2 || 0.0 || 9.9 || 3.4 || 13.2 || 2.4 || 0.8 || 2
|-
! scope="row" style="text-align:center" | 1996
|style="text-align:center;"|
| 35 || 17 || 4 || 2 || 200 || 90 || 290 || 67 || 23 || 0.2 || 0.1 || 11.8 || 5.3 || 17.1 || 3.9 || 1.4 || 5
|- style="background-color: #EAEAEA"
|style="text-align:center;background:#afe6ba;"|1997†
|style="text-align:center;"|
| 35 || 22 || 9 || 3 || 188 || 59 || 247 || 66 || 16 || 0.4 || 0.1 || 8.5 || 2.7 || 11.2 || 3.0 || 0.7 || 5
|-
! scope="row" style="text-align:center" | 1998
|style="text-align:center;"|
| 35 || 9 || 13 || 6 || 53 || 19 || 72 || 21 || 8 || 1.4 || 0.7 || 5.9 || 2.1 || 8.0 || 2.3 || 0.9 || 1
|- style="background-color: #EAEAEA"
! scope="row" style="text-align:center" | 1999
|style="text-align:center;"|
| 35 || 12 || 5 || 2 || 86 || 56 || 142 || 31 || 9 || 0.4 || 0.2 || 7.2 || 4.7 || 11.8 || 2.6 || 0.8 || 1
|- class="sortbottom"
! colspan=3| Career
! 153
! 113
! 57
! 1422
! 692
! 2114
! 483
! 161
! 0.7
! 0.4
! 9.3
! 4.5
! 13.8
! 3.2
! 1.1
! 14
|}

References 

1970 births
Living people
Adelaide Football Club players
Adelaide Football Club Premiership players
Glenelg Football Club players
Australian rules footballers from South Australia
One-time VFL/AFL Premiership players